Tangram is the thirteenth major release and tenth studio album by the electronic music group Tangerine Dream. It became their fifth biggest selling album, reaching #36 in the British Top 40, and spending 5 weeks on the chart.

Overview
At a turning point between two eras, Tangram contains fond glimpses back at the "classic long-form sequencer" period and also contains foreshadows of the "new age melodic short track" period to come. It introduced new member Johannes Schmoelling, re-establishing the band as a keyboard trio.

Each set contains multiple movements, some rhythmic, some atmospheric. An early live set in East Berlin (recorded in January 1980 and documented in Tangerine Dream's Quichotte, later retitled Pergamon) contains passages similar to Tangram.

Track listing

Personnel
 Edgar Froese — keyboards, guitars
 Christopher Franke — keyboards, electronic percussion
 Johannes Schmoelling — keyboards
 Eduard Meyer — mixing engineer, Hansa Studios, Berlin
 Monica Froese — cover photo (all editions), sleeve design ("Definitive Edition")

Some CD editions erroneously credit Peter Baumann instead of Schmoelling.

References

1980 albums
Tangerine Dream albums
Virgin Records albums